Gonguê (or Gonguê bell) is a Brazilian percussion instrument. It is a type of Cowbell (instrument) consisting of a big, flat iron bell, measuring from 20 to 30 cm, and a cable that serves as a support. The Gonguê is usually played with a metal drumstick, and it is typically used in north-eastern Brazilian music, accentuating the beats and doing rhythmic phrases, generally formed by off-beats and syncopated patterns. To avoid fatigue, players normally support it against the body. Due to its size, the Gonguê has a loud and strident sound, more clangorous than other types of cowbells.

See also
 Maracatu
 Agogô
 Alfaia

External links 
 BlogBrincante 
 Maracatu Lua Nova

References 

Brazilian percussion